Richard Ray Brattin Jr. (born July 22, 1980) is an American politician serving as a Republican state senator from the U.S. state of Missouri, representing the 31st district taking up Cass, Bates, Barton, Henry, and Vernon Counties.  He is a former state representative, having served three terms in the Missouri House of Representatives. He represented Missouri's 55th Legislative District, which encompasses several suburbs of Kansas City in Cass County, including Raymore, Peculiar, and Lake Winnebago. He is currently Vice Chairman of the Corrections and Consumer Affairs committees.

Early life and military career
Brattin was born on July 22, 1980. He was raised in Greenwood, Missouri, and is a graduate of Lee's Summit High School.

After the September 11 attacks, he joined the United States Marine Corps. He rose through the ranks and became a sergeant after six years. He was elected to the Missouri House of Representatives in 2010.

Issues

Education
In 2013, Brattin sponsored legislation that would afford equal treatment in textbooks for intelligent design and evolution.

In January 2017, Brattin proposed a bill to end tenure in public universities in Missouri. The bill would also "require public colleges to publish estimated costs of degrees, employment opportunities expected for graduates, average salaries of previous graduates, and a summary of the job market, among other things."

Social issues
In December 2014, Brattin proposed legislation that would require women seeking abortions in Missouri to obtain written consent from the father of the fetus, except in cases of "legitimate rape." Brattin cited his own recent vasectomy as his inspiration for the legislation.

Welfare
In February 2015, Brattin introduced Missouri House Bill 813, reading "A recipient of supplemental nutrition assistance program benefits shall not use such benefits to purchase cookies, chips, energy drinks, soft drinks, seafood, or steak."

Free speech

In 2015, in response to a protest by the University of Missouri football team related to campus discrimination, Brattin proposed a bill that would strip a college athlete of their scholarship if the athlete "calls, incites, supports or participates in any strike or concerted refusal to play a scheduled game."

In 2021, the state senator proposed a bill that would target unlawful assemblies, including the use of deadly force against protesters on private property.

Homosexuality
In 2017, Brattin made a statement on the Missouri House floor that "When you look at the tenets of religion, of the Bible, of the Qur’an, of other religions, there is a distinction between homosexuality and just being a human being." The Kansas City Star called his position intolerant and said in an editorial, "The statement, made on the Missouri House floor, was deplorable. It betrayed a stunning lack of understanding of theology and self-government: The Constitution protects all Americans from the tyranny of any single faith-based approach to secular law."

Electoral history

State Representative

State Senate

U.S. Representative

Personal life
Brattin is married and has five children.

References

1980 births
21st-century American politicians
Living people
Republican Party Missouri state senators
Republican Party members of the Missouri House of Representatives
People from Greenwood, Missouri
People from Harrisonville, Missouri